Limestone Correctional Facility is an Alabama Department of Corrections state prison for men located in Harvest, Limestone County, Alabama.  Opened in October 1984 and with a capacity of 2086 prisoners, Limestone is the largest prison in the Alabama state system. This institution is classified as a maximum security correctional facility.

Limestone and the Julia Tutwiler Prison for Women were the two Alabama state prisons in which HIV positive inmates were segregated, a practice that Alabama and South Carolina claimed stopped the spread of the virus and lowered overall medical costs.  On December 21, 2012, U.S. District Court Justice Myron Herbert Thompson found that the segregation violated the Americans with Disabilities Act.

The prison operates a farming and cattle operation on its surrounding  of land.

References

Prisons in Alabama
Buildings and structures in Limestone County, Alabama
1984 establishments in Alabama